General Carrera may refer to:

 General Carrera Lake, a lake located in Patagonia and shared by Argentina and Chile
 General Carrera Province, one of four provinces of the southern Chilean region of Aisen

See also 
 José Miguel Carrera  (1785–1821), Chilean general and one of the founders of independent Chile